Leeds Dutch Reformed Church is a historic Dutch Reformed church on Co. Rt. 23B (Susquehanna Turnpike) in Leeds, Greene County, New York.  It was built about 1818 and is a two-story, gable fronted stone church with restrained Federal / Greek Revival style features.  It is rectangular in plan, three bays wide and four bays deep.  It features a square, two stage belfry topped by an octagonal, metal shingle clad spire added about 1855.

It was added to the National Register of Historic Places in 1996.

References

External links

Reformed Church in America churches in New York (state)
Churches on the National Register of Historic Places in New York (state)
Historic American Buildings Survey in New York (state)
Reformed Church in America churches
Federal architecture in New York (state)
Churches in Greene County, New York
Churches completed in 1818
National Register of Historic Places in Greene County, New York